Marampa Chiefdom is a chiefdom in Port Loko District of Sierra Leone. Its capital is Lunsar.

References 

Chiefdoms of Sierra Leone
Northern Province, Sierra Leone